This Is Lone Justice: The Vaught Tapes, 1983 is a compilation album by American band Lone Justice, released in January 2014 by Omnivore Recordings. The twelve songs include nine previously unissued tracks recorded at Suite 16 Studios, Los Angeles, in December 1983 by engineer David Vaught with direct to two-track tape and no overdubs. "Rattlesnake Mama", "Working Man's Blues" and "This World Is Not My Home" have previously been released on the 1999 compilation album This World Is Not My Home.   

Accompanying the music was an essay by guitarist Ryan Hedgecock, a remembrance of Vaught written by baisst Marvin Etzioni, liner notes by veteran L.A. music journalist Chris Morris and a shout-out to the band from Dolly Parton, to whom lead singer Maria McKee was frequently compared.

Track listing
Writing credits adapted from the album's liner notes.

Personnel 
Adapted from the album's liner notes.

Lone Justice
Maria McKee – vocals, guitar
Ryan Hedgecock – guitar, vocals
Marvin Etzioni – bass, vocals
Don Heffington – drums

Production
Lone Justice – producer
David Vaught – engineer
Bernie Grundman – mastering

References

2014 compilation albums
Lone Justice albums
Omnivore Recordings albums